The 2017 All-SEC football team consists of American football players selected to the All-Southeastern Conference (SEC) chosen by the Associated Press (AP) and the conference coaches for the 2017 Southeastern Conference football season.

Georgia won the conference, in a rematch, beating Auburn 28–7 in the SEC Championship.

Auburn running back Kerryon Johnson was voted the AP SEC Offensive Player of the Year. Georgia linebacker Roquan Smith was voted the AP SEC Defensive Player of the Year.

Offensive selections

Quarterbacks
Drew Lock, Missouri (AP-1, Coaches-1)
Jarrett Stidham, Auburn (AP-1, Coaches-1)

Running backs
Kerryon Johnson, Auburn (AP-1, Coaches-1)
Benny Snell , Kentucky (AP-1, Coaches-2)
Nick Chubb, Georgia (AP-2, Coaches-1)
Derrius Guice, LSU (AP-2, Coaches-2)

Wide receivers
A. J. Brown, Ole Miss (AP-1, Coaches-1)
Calvin Ridley, Alabama (AP-1, Coaches-1)
J'Mon Moore, Missouri (AP-2,Coaches-2)
Christian Kirk, Texas A&M (AP-2, Coaches-2)

Centers

Will Clapp, LSU (AP-1, Coaches-1)
Bradley Bozeman, Alabama (AP-1, Coaches-2)
Frank Ragnow, Arkansas (AP-2)

Guards
Braden Smith, Auburn (AP-1, Coaches-1)
Ross Pierschbacher, Alabama (AP-1)
Greg Little, Ole Miss (AP-2, Coaches-2)
Trey Smith, Tennessee (AP-2, Coaches-2)
Garrett Brumfield, LSU (Coaches-2)

Tackles
Jonah Williams, Alabama (AP-1, Coaches-1)
Isaiah Wynn, Georgia (AP-1, Coaches-1)
Martinas Rankin, Miss St (AP-2, Coaches-1)
Martez Ivey, Florida (AP-2, Coaches-2)

Tight ends
Hayden Hurst, South Carolina (AP-1, Coaches-1)
Albert Okwuegbunam, Missouri (AP-2, Coaches-2)

Defensive selections

Defensive ends
Jeff Holland, Auburn (AP-1, Coaches-1)
Montez Sweat, Miss St (AP-1, Coaches-1)
Marcell Frazier, Missouri (AP-2, Coaches-2)
Marquis Haynes, Ole Miss (AP-2, Coaches-2)
Dante Sawyer, South Carolina (AP-2)
Da'Shawn Hand, Alabama (Coaches-2)

Defensive tackles
Jeffery Simmons, Miss St (AP-1, Coaches-1)
Daron Payne, Alabama (AP-1, Coaches-2)
Raekwon Davis, Alabama (AP-2, Coaches-1)
Taven Bryan, Florida (AP-2)
Breeland Speaks, Ole Miss (AP-2)

Linebackers
Roquan Smith, Georgia (AP-1, Coaches-1)
Devin White, LSU (AP-1, Coaches-1)
Rashaan Evans, Alabama (AP-1, Coaches-2)
Skai Moore, South Carolina (AP-2, Coaches-1)
Arden Key, LSU (AP-1)
Lorenzo Carter, Georgia (AP-2, Coaches-2)
Josh Allen, Kentucky (AP-2)
De'Jon Harris, Arkansas (AP-2)
Charles Wright, Vanderbilt (AP-2)
Tre Williams, Auburn (Coaches-2)

Cornerbacks
Armani Watts, Texas A&M (AP-1, Coaches-1)
Andraez Williams, LSU (AP-1, Coaches-2)
Duke Dawson, Florida (AP-2, Coaches-1)
Carlton Davis, Auburn (AP-2, Coaches-1)
C. J. Henderson, Florida (AP-2)
Levi Wallace, Alabama (AP-2)
Donte Jackson, LSU (Coaches-2)
Deandre Baker, Georgia (Coaches-2)

Safeties
Minkah Fitzpatrick, Alabama (AP-1, Coaches-1)
Ronnie Harrison, Alabama (AP-1, Coaches-2)
J. R. Reed, Georgia (AP-2)

Special teams

Kickers
Daniel Carlson, Auburn (AP-1, Coaches-1)
Eddy Piñeiro, Florida (AP-2, Coaches-2)

Punters

Johnny Townsend, Florida (AP-1, Coaches-2)
J. K. Scott, Alabama (AP-2, Coaches-1)

All purpose/return specialist
Christian Kirk, Texas A&M (AP-1, Coaches-1)
A. J. Brown, Ole Miss (Coaches-2)
Mecole Hardman, Georgia (AP-2)
D. J. Chark, LSU (AP-2, Coaches-2)

Key

See also
2017 Southeastern Conference football season
2017 College Football All-America Team

References

All-Southeastern Conference
All-SEC football teams